Ryan Davis may refer to:

Ryan Davis (defensive end) (born 1989), American football defensive end 
Ryan Davis (wide receiver) (born 1997), gridiron football wide receiver
Ryan Davis (Australian footballer) (born 1989), Australian rules footballer
Ryan Davis (musician) (born 1983), German electronica and techno producer
Ryan Davis (rugby union) (born 1985), English rugby union player
Ryan Davis (basketball), American college basketball player
Ryan Davis (video game journalist) (1979–2013), writer on video games
Ryan J. Davis (born 1982), American theater director, writer, political consultant and progressive activist

See also
Ryan Davies (1937–1977), Welsh entertainer
Ryan Davies (cricketer) (born 1996), English cricketer